Qualicum Beach Airport  is located  south of Qualicum Beach, British Columbia, Canada.

Tenants
The following are at the airport:

Iskwew Air
Qualicum Flight Centre
Oceanside Air
Royal Canadian Air Cadets - 893 Squadron
Sunwest Helicopters
Qualicum Beach Aero Centre
Ascent Helicopters
ZFF Engines Limited
Airspan Helicopters
The Final Approach Restaurant
Arrowsmith Search and Rescue

Airlines and destinations

Accidents and Incidents

Cessna 172 
On July 25th, 2022, a Cessna 172 made an emergency landing just past the runway at the airport. The plane crashed into a ditch on a farmer's property. The pilot was said to be in serious condition, suffering injuries, but survived.

See also
 List of airports on Vancouver Island

References

External links

Qualicum Beach Airport on COPA's Places to Fly airport directory

Certified airports in British Columbia
Regional District of Nanaimo